Austin Hart (born December 7, 1991), better known by his stage name L’Orange, is an American hip hop record producer from North Carolina. He is signed to Mello Music Group.

A documentary film about his severe hearing loss due to cholesteatoma premiered at the Slamdance Film Festival on January 20, 2023.

Discography

Studio albums
 Old Soul (2011)
 The Mad Writer (2012)
 The City Under the City (2013) 
 The Orchid Days (2014)
 The Night Took Us In like Family (2015) 
 Time? Astonishing! (2015) 
 The Life & Death of Scenery (2016) 
 The Ordinary Man (2017)
 Marlowe (2018) 
 Complicate Your Life with Violence (2019) 
 Marlowe 2 (2020) 
 Imaginary Everything (2021) 
 The World is Still Chaos, But I feel Better (2021)
 Marlowe 3 (2022)

EPs
 The Manipulation EP (2011)
 Still Spinning (2012)
 After the Flowers (2014)
 Koala (2016)

Singles
 "Whin" (2012)
 "Until the Break" (2012)
 "Alone" (2013)
 "Super Hero" (2016)
 "Blame the Author" (2017)
 "Lost Arts" (2018)
 "Demonstration" (2018)
 "The Basement" (2018)
 "The Talkative Mailman Can't Read" (2018)
 "Dead Battery" (2019)
 "Future Power Sources" (2020)
 "O.G. Funk Rock" (2020)
 "Lamilton Taeshawn" (2020)
 "Otherworld" (2020)
 "Corner Store Scandal" (2021)
 "Point to Point" (2021)
 "Past Life" (2022)
 "Royal" (2022)

Musical Style
For his Music He samples old Jazz, Swing and Soul songs which he combines with old radio broadcasts and film noir audios. To produce his songs he uses a MPC and old vinyl records amongst other equipment. For Marlowe, his collaboration with rapper Solemn Brigham he also samples old Rock and Blues songs.

References

External links
 
 

1984 births
Living people
Record producers from North Carolina
American hip hop record producers
Mello Music Group artists
Deaf musicians